The Israeli Navy Band was an ensemble of the Israeli Navy, and was one of many in the Israel Defense Force (IDF).

History

Early years
The navy band first appeared in October 1948. The band consisted of 13 active duty soldiers. Since their commanders did not oversee their activities, expenses began to pile up and the band was disbanded. In the early 1960s, a officers from the Education and Youth Corps asked a group of reservists to form the Lehakat Kheil Hayam (Naval Corps Entertainment Group). Its early members included Dan Almagor, Rivka Zohar, and Meir Noy. Upon its creation, it immediately began rehearsing for the program Ve BaYom HaShlishi ("And On The Third Day"). In 1967, the Navy Band performed the song "Mah Avarekh" written by Rachel Shapira in memory of a young man from her Kibbutz who fell in the Six-Day War. The band performed at internal naval events, especially during the Sea Corps celebrations, and in the mid-1960s active duty soldiers were also incorporated as a part-time life crew. When the decision was made in the Navy to form a representative band, the Six-Day War broke out and only afterwards were the resources were allocated to form the band.

1970s
In the 1970s, the band continued its momentum of success even after the band's release of previous programs. The band even won the Israel Band of the Year award in 1970 and 1972 as part of the annual Hebrew chanting parade and hits such as "Haska", "Only the Sea Is Silent", and "On the Road" captured the radio.

Like many bands, the Yom Kippur War marked the end of the glamor period. The band's plans were not as successful as its predecessors, and towards the end of 1975 the band was disbanded. Prominent alumni of the band during this period were Haya Arad, Oded Ben-Hur, Yael Levy, Albert Piamente and Uzi Asner.

1980s and present

Despite the establishment of the military bands in the 1980s in most of the commands and arms, the Navy did not re-establish a band. The Variety Ensemble of the Israeli Navy currently serves as the Premier musical unit of the navy. Netta Barzilai, who is an Israeli singer, recording artist, and looping artist, as well as a winner of the fifth season of HaKokhav HaBa, also winner of the 2018 Eurovision Song Contest (with her famous song "Toy") was a member of the band.

Notable members
Among the prominent alumni of the band:

Rivka Zohar
Shlomo Artzi
Netta Barzilai
Riki Gal
Dov Glickman

References

Israeli Navy
Israeli military bands
1948 establishments in Israel
1975 disestablishments in Israel
Military units and formations established in 1948